Gabriela Dabrowski and Rohan Bopanna were the defending champions, but chose not to compete together. Bopanna teamed up with Tímea Babos, but lost in the first round to Zhang Shuai and John Peers. Dabrowski played alongside Mate Pavić, but lost to Latisha Chan and Ivan Dodig in the final, 6–1, 6–7(5–7), [10–8].

Seeds

Draw

Finals

Top half

Bottom half

References

External links
2018 French Open – Doubles draws and results at the International Tennis Federation

Mixed Doubles
French Open - Mixed Doubles
French Open - Mixed Doubles
French Open by year – Mixed doubles